Neritan Ceka (born 11 February 1941) is an Albanian archaeologist, professor, and politician.  He served as Albania's Minister of Internal Affairs from 27 July 1997 to 18 April 1998.

Early life
Ceka was born in  Tirana. Ceka studied at the Qemal Stafa High School, in Tirana, Albania.

He is the son of Hasan Ceka, a prominent Albanian archeologist, who inspired Neritan to pursue a career in archaeology.

Political career
Ceka was a founding member of the Democratic Party of Albania and has been active in politics since 1990.

In 1992, Ceka left the Democratic Party following a conflict with the party's leader, Sali Berisha. Ceka founded the Democratic Alliance Party, which would go on to ally with the main opponent of the Democratic Party, the Socialist Party of Albania, in 1997. Ceka served as Minister of Internal Affairs from 27 July 1997 to 18 April 1998, in the government of Prime Minister Fatos Nano.

Work
He has written several books:
 Apollonia: History and Monuments
 Arkeologjia: Greqia, Roma, Iliria with Muzafer Korkuti
 Buthrotum: Its History and Monuments
 Butrint
 Byllis: Its History and Monuments with Skender Mucaj
 Iliret

References

1941 births
Living people
Albanian archaeologists
Albanian politicians
Qemal Stafa High School alumni
People from Tirana
Ambassadors of Albania to Italy
Illyrologists